Chéniers is a commune in the Creuse department in the Nouvelle-Aquitaine region in central France.

Geography

Population

Sights
 The church of St. Martin, dating from the twelfth century.
 A restored watermill at the hamlet of Piot.
 The remains of a feudal castle at Monty.
 A large covered lavoir in the town.

See also
Communes of the Creuse department

References

Communes of Creuse